Interex EMEA was the EMEA HP Users Organisation, representing the user community of Hewlett-Packard computers. 

The Connect User Group Community, formed from the consolidation in May, 2008 of Interex EMEA, Encompass, and ITUG, is the Hewlett-Packard’s largest user community representing more than 50,000 participants.

Overview 

The group was organised by NUGs (National User Groups, by country)
and SIGs (Special Interest Groups, by product).

They organised seminars, training, information exchange,
as well as international travel to IT events. They intended to independently inform their users community and help them to get the maximum from their investments. Their mission was to facilitate the usage of HP-UX, OpenVMS, Tru64 UNIX, NonStop Kernel & Linux on servers & networks produced and supported by Hewlett-Packard.

The HP-Interex user groups had no direct affiliations with Hewlett-Packard, but they tried to collaborate with HP to provide their users with an optimum support and they gave feedback about potential future OS content, and users' issues.

The group consisted of mainly
IT Managers, System Managers, System Administrators, Application Development Managers and Consultants and promoted the exchange of information and experience between the members, HP and its partners.

In general HP-Interex stimulated the IT - Business alignment.

Membership advantages are the following, now supported by the Connect (users group):

 Access to the group activities
 Reduction for training
 Communication channel with Hewlett-Packard Management
 Join the OpenVMS Hobbyist license project, allowing to run OpenVMS using a free license for private non-profit hobby usage.
 Interact and partner with other members of the organisation
 Gather and distribute information via its web sites and support and discussion forums.

Groups 
Related groups are: DECUS, Compaq Users Organisation (CUO), Encompass, ITUG.

Some early and well-known members of DECUS were the late Terry Shannon and John R. Wisniewski.

History 

Originally the users group was called DECUS, at the time Digital Equipment Corporation conducted its business in the 1960s - 1990s.

When Compaq acquired Digital in 1998, the users group was baptised as the Compaq Users Organisation (CUO).

Finally when Hewlett-Packard acquired Compaq in 2002, CUO was renamed as HP-Interex, although there are still DECUS groups in Germany. In the USA, the organisation is represented by the Encompass and ITUG organisation.

See also 
 Connect (users group)
 Digital Equipment Corporation
 Compaq
 Hewlett-Packard
 Tandem Computers

External links 
 Encompass U.S.
 ITUG User Group
 OpenVMS Hobbyist License Organisation
 HP Technology Forum & Expo (JAN 2916: page not found)
 HP User Advocacy Organisation (JAN 2916: page not found)
 OpenVMS.org 
 Tru64.org
 A LinkedIn group for DEC enthusiasts

Computer clubs
Hewlett-Packard
Digital Equipment Corporation
Organizations disestablished in 2008